Saint-Jean is a federal electoral district in Quebec, Canada, that has been represented in the House of Commons of Canada since 1968.

Geography

The riding extends along the Richelieu River southeast of Montreal, in the Quebec region of Montérégie. It consists of the northern and western parts of the RCM of Le Haut-Richelieu.

The neighbouring ridings are Beauharnois—Salaberry, Brossard—La Prairie, Chambly—Borduas, Shefford, and Brome—Missisquoi.

Its population is 102,902, with 85,659 registered electors, and has an area of 734 km².

Profile
Long a Bloc stronghold, the riding of Saint-Jean turned orange as the NDP swept the province of Quebec in 2011. BQ support was generally spread evenly throughout the riding, like the victorious NDP. The Liberals did slightly better in and around Lacolle than in other portions of the seat but had weak support in all parts of the riding. The Conservatives did have some pockets of good support, but they were largely isolated. Their support was largely uniform, although they did slightly better in the rural areas.

History

It was created in 1966 from parts of Beauharnois—Salaberry, Châteauguay—Huntingdon—Laprairie and Saint-Jean—Iberville—Napierville ridings.

This riding was not changed during the 2012 electoral redistribution.

Members of Parliament

Election results

59,210
91,951

	
	

		
Note: Conservative vote is compared to the total of the Canadian Alliance vote and Progressive Conservative vote in 2000 election.
							
				

					

					

					

						

Note: Social Credit vote is compared to Ralliement créditiste vote in the 1968 election.

See also
 List of Canadian federal electoral districts
 Past Canadian electoral districts

References

Campaign expense data from Elections Canada
Riding history from the Library of Parliament
2011 Results from Elections Canada

Notes

Quebec federal electoral districts
Saint-Jean-sur-Richelieu
Le Haut-Richelieu Regional County Municipality